Tomás "Toto" Gana (born 17 April 1997) is a Chilean amateur golfer.

Gana was born in Santiago de Chile. He won the 2017 Latin America Amateur Championship, thereby earning an invitation to the 2017 Masters Tournament, where he finished in last place among the 93 starters. He represented Chile at the 2015 Toyota Junior Golf World Cup. He plays college golf for the Lynn Fighting Knights in Boca Raton, Florida, United States.

Amateur wins
2017 Latin America Amateur Championship, Torneo Aficionado Copa Fortox Bucaramanga

Source:

Results in major championships

CUT = missed the half-way cut

Team appearances
Eisenhower Trophy (representing Chile): 2018

References

External links
Toto Gana at the World Amateur Golf Ranking

Chilean male golfers
Amateur golfers
Lynn Fighting Knights men's golfers
Sportspeople from Santiago
1997 births
Living people
21st-century Chilean people